Luigi Busatti (1763 – 30 June 1821), also known as Luigi Bussatti, was an Italian painter and scenic designer from Bologna. He trained under Vincenzo Martinelli. Busatti excelled in landscapes.

Biography
He painted in the Palazzo Hercolani in Bologna, and in the Certosa where he decorated the monument to Martinelli, collaborating with Pietro Fancelli. He designed theatrical scenery for Teatro Zagnoni, Teatro Comunale, the Nuovo Teatro del Corso, and the Teatro Contavalli, and in Florence for the Teatro della Pergola. He taught landscape art at the Academy of Fine Arts of Bologna.

References 
 Entry by Anna Ottani in Treccani Encyclopedia

1763 births
1821 deaths
18th-century Italian painters
Italian male painters
19th-century Italian painters
Painters from Bologna
Italian scenic designers
19th-century Italian male artists
18th-century Italian male artists